Summerly (March 31, 2002 – March 30, 2021) was an American Thoroughbred racehorse best known for winning the Grade 1 Kentucky Oaks in 2005. She was sired by 1990 Preakness Stakes winner, Summer Squall and out of the Mr. Prospector mare, Here I Go.

Summerly raced from age two through age four and was then retired. She was sold at the November 2006 Fasig-Tipton broodmare sale for $3.3 million to WinStar Farm of Versailles, Kentucky. In 2008 and again in 2009, Summerly produced a colt by Distorted Humor. She produced a colt by Tiznow named State Line. She also had a filly by Kentucky Derby winner Super Saver. In 2018, she produced a filly by Carpe Diem.

Summerly died of colic on March 30, 2021, at the age of 19.

References

2002 racehorse births
2021 racehorse deaths
Racehorses bred in Kentucky
Racehorses trained in the United States
Kentucky Oaks winners
Thoroughbred family 10-a